Anarak is a city in Isfahan Province, Iran.

Anarak may refer to various places in Iran:
 Anarak, Arsanjan, Fars Province
 Anarak, Khorrambid, Fars Province
 Anarak, Ilam
 Anarak, Qaleh Ganj, Kerman Province
 Anarak-e Bala, Kerman Province
 Anarak-e Pain, Kerman Province
 Anarak, Kermanshah
 Anarak-e Olya, Kermanshah Province
 Anarak-e Sofla, Kermanshah Province
 Anarak, Kohgiluyeh and Boyer-Ahmad
 Anarak District, in Isfahan Province